Gašper Tkačik (born 1979) is a Slovenian theoretical physicist and computational neuroscientist.

Life and work
After completing his International Baccalaureate from Bežigrad high school in Ljubljana, he enrolled in the department of mathematics and physics at the University of Ljubljana, where he received a Bachelor of Science degree in physics in 2001. He continued his studies at Princeton University with William Bialek and Curtis Callan where he received a PhD in physics. Later he was a postdoc at the University of Pennsylvania until he was employed at the Institute of Science and Technology Austria.

References

1979 births
Living people
Slovenian physicists
University of Ljubljana alumni
Princeton University alumni
Scientists from Ljubljana
Computational neuroscience
21st-century physicists